Baumann Fiord is a natural inlet in the south-west of Ellesmere Island, Qikiqtaaluk Region, Nunavut in the Arctic Archipelago. To the west, it opens into Norwegian Bay.  Hoved Island lies in the fiord.

References

Ellesmere Island
Fjords of Qikiqtaaluk Region